The Patrologia Latina (Latin for The Latin Patrology) is an enormous collection of the writings of the Church Fathers and other ecclesiastical writers published by Jacques-Paul Migne between 1841 and 1855, with indices published between 1862 and 1865. It is also known as the Latin series as it formed one half of Migne's Patrologiae Cursus Completus, the other part being the Patrologia Graeco-Latina of patristic and medieval Greek works with their (sometimes non-matching) medieval Latin translations.

Although consisting of reprints of old editions, which often contain mistakes and do not comply with modern standards of scholarship, the series, due to its availability (it is present in many academic libraries) and the fact that it incorporates many texts of which no modern critical edition is available, is still widely used by scholars of the Middle Ages and is in this respect comparable to the Monumenta Germaniae Historica.

The Patrologia Latina includes Latin works spanning a millennium, from Tertullian (d. 230) to Pope Innocent III (d. 1216), edited in roughly chronological order in 217 volumes; 
volumes 1 to 73, from Tertullian to Gregory of Tours, were published from 1841 to 1849, and volumes 74 to 217, from Pope Gregory I to Innocent III, from 1849 to 1855. 
Although the collection ends with Innocent III,
Migne originally wanted to include documents all the way up to the Reformation; this task proved too great, but some later commentaries or documents associated with earlier works were included.

Most of the works are ecclesiastic in nature, but there are also documents of literary, historical or linguistic (such as the Gothic bible in vol. 18) interest.

The original printing plates for the Patrologia were destroyed by fire in 1868. However, with help from the Garnier printing house they were restored, and new editions were printed beginning in the 1880s. The content within these reprints is not always identical to the original series, either in quality or internal arrangement. The new editions have been described as "inferior in a number of respects to Migne's own first editions."

The University of Zurich has digitised the Patrologia Latina as part of its Corpus Córporum, developed under the direction of Ph. Roelli, Institute for Greek and Latin Philology.

Table of contents
The Patrologia Latina contains authors of the 2nd to 13th centuries, in roughly chronological order, in 217 volumes:
2nd–4th c.: 1–19;
4th–5th c.: 20–63;
5th–6th c.: 64–72;
6th–7th c.: 74–88;
7th–8th c.: 89–96;
8th–9th c.: 97–130;
9th/10th c.: 131–136;
10th/11th c.: 137–149;
11th/12th c.: 151–174;
12th c.: 175–205;
12th/13th c.: 206–217.

Authors by rank or background

Secular rulers

 Byzantine emperor Alexius I Comnenus (155)
 Crusader King Baldwin I of Jerusalem (155)
 Roman emperor Constantine I (8)
 Frankish Emperor Charlemagne (97–98)
 King Charles the Bald (124)
 Crusader Godfrey of Bouillon (155)
 Henry II, Holy Roman Emperor (140)
 King Lotharius I (97–98)
 King Louis the Pious (104)
 King Louis VII of France (155)

Popes

Pope Adrian IV (188)
Pope Alexander III (200)
Pope Anastasius IV (188)
Pope Benedict I (72)
Pope Benedict III (115)
Pope Boniface II (64)
Pope Calixtus II (163)
Pope Celestine III (206)
Pope Clement III (204)
Pope Cornelius (3)
Pope Eugene III (180)
Pope Felix III (58)
Pope Felix IV (64)
Pope Gelasius I (59)
Pope Gelasius II (163)
Pope Gregory I (75–79)
Pope Gregory IV (106)
Pope Gregory VIII (202)
Pope Hilarius (58)
Pope Honorius II (166)
Pope Hormisdas (63)
Pope Innocent III (214–217)
Pope John II (72)
Pope John VI (89)
Pope John XIII (135)
Pope John XIX (141)
Pope Innocent I (20)
Pope Leo I (54–56)
Pope Leo II (96)
Pope Leo IV (115)
Pope Nicholas I (119)
Pope Paschal II (163)
Pope Pelagius II (72)
Pope Sergius I (89)
Pope Sergius II (106)
Pope Simplicius (58)
Pope Stephen I (3)
Pope Sylvester II (139)
Pope Leo IX (143)
Pope Gregory VII (148)
Pope Victor III (149)
Pope Urban II (151)
Pope Urban III (202)

Other bishops

 Absalon, bishop of Roskilde, Danish statesman and archbishop of Lund (209)
 Adalberon, bishop of Laon (141)
 Aldhelm, Bishop of Sherborne (89)
 Bishop Saint Ambrose of Milan (14–17)
 Archbishop Anselm of Canterbury (158–159)
 Bishop Anselm of Lucca (149)
 Bishop Saint Augustine of Hippo (32–47)
 Bishop Avitus of Vienne (59)
 Bishop Baldric of Dol-en-Bretagne (166)
 Saint Cassian of Imola, bishop of Brescia (49–50)
 Bishop of Poitiers Gilbert de la Porrée (64)
 Bishop Saint Gregory of Tours (71)
 Bishop Saint Hilary of Arles (50)
 Bishop Saint Hilary of Poitiers, Doctor of the Church (9–10)
 Bishop Saint Isidore of Seville (81–84)
 Bishop Ivo of Chartres (161–162)
 Bishop of Chartres John of Salisbury (199)
 Archbishop of Canterbury Lanfranc (150)
 Bishop Liutprand of Cremona (136)
 Bishop Saint Martin of Tours (18)
 Bishop of Paris Maurice de Sully (200)
 Bishop Odo of Bayeux (155)
 Missionary Bishop Saint Patrick (53)
 Bishop Saint Paulinus of Nola (61)
 Bishop of Paris Peter Lombard (191–192)
 Archbishop of Canterbury Theodore of Tarsus (99)
 Bishop Thietmar of Merseburg (139)
 Archbishop of Canterbury Saint Thomas Becket (190)
 Missionary Bishop Ulfilas, bible translator into Gothic (18)
 Archbishop William of Tyre (201)

Other clerics

 Abbot Abbo of Fleury (139)
 Abbot Adam of Perseigne (211)
 Adémar de Chabannes (141)
 Alger of Liège (180)
 archdeacon Anselm of Laon (162)
 Abbot Saint Benedict of Aniane (103)
 Abbot Saint Benedict of Nursia (66)
 Abbot Saint Bernard of Clairvaux, Doctor of the Church (182–185)
 Presbyter Coelius Sedulius, poet (19)
 Monk Dionysius Exiguus (Dennis the Little or Dennis the Short) (67)
 Dudon or Dudo of Saint-Quentin, dean of Saint-Quentin (141)
 Helinand of Froidmont (212)
 Gildas of Rhuys and Llancarfan (69)
 Monk Honorius of Autun (172)
 Monk Hugh of St. Victor, philosopher (175–177)
 Abbot Saint Odo of Cluny (133)
 Benedictine monk Otloh of St. Emmeram (146)
 Petrus Comestor (198)
 Peter Tudebode (155)
 Uncanonized Saint Peter the Venerable, abbot of Cluny (189)
 Abbot Regino of Prüm (132)
 Prior Richard of St. Victor (196)
 Cistercian Abbot Robert of Molesme (157)
 Robert the Monk (155)
 Monk Rufinus of Aquileia, translator (21)
 Abbot Suger of Saint-Denis (186)
 Orderic Vitalis (188)
 Monk William of Malmesbury, historian (179)

Others
Including those not yet categorized

 Peter Abelard (178)
 Adam of Bremen (146)
 Aimoin (139)
 Alain de Lille (210)
 Alcuin (100–101)
 Arnobius (5)
 Aurelius Prudentius Clemens (60)
 Bede (90–95)
 Boethius (63–64)
 Saint Boniface (89)
 Bruno of Chartreuse (152–153)
 Cassiodorus (69–70)
 Cyprian (3–4)
 False Decretals (56)
 Dunstan (137)
 Einhard (104)
 Eusebius of Vercelli (12)
 Flodoard (135)
 Fulbert of Chartres (141)
 Fulcher of Chartres (155)
 Gaius Marius Victorinus (8)
 Gottschalk (121)
 Gratian (187)
 Guibert of Nogent (156)
 Helgaud (141)
 Helinand of Froidmont (212)
 Hermannus Contractus (also called Hermann of Reichenau or Hermannus Augiensis)(143)
 Hildegard of Bingen (197)
 Hincmar (125–126)
 Hroswitha of Gandersheim (137)
 Pseudo-Isidore (130)
 Saint Jerome (22–30)
 Johannes Scotus Eriugena (122)
 Lactantius (6–7)
 Lucifer Calaritanus (13)
 Magnus Felix Ennodius, Latin rhetorician and poet (63)
 Marcus Minucius Felix (3)
 Marianus Scotus (147)
 Novatian (3)
 Orosius (31)
 Pelagius (21)
 Peter of Blois, French poet and diplomat (207)
 Rabanus Maurus (107–112)
 Radbertus (120)
 Ratramnus (121)
 Raymond of Aguilers (155)
 Saint Prosper of Aquitaine (51)
 Salvian (53)
 Symmachus (18)
 Saint Sulpicius Severus (20)
 Tertullian (volumes 1–2)
 Theodulf (105)
 Venantius Fortunatus (88)
 Saint Vincent of Lérins (50)
 Walafrid Strabo (113–114)
 Walter of Châtillon (209)
 Walter the Chancellor (155)

See also
Patrologia Graeca
Patrologia Orientalis
Corpus Scriptorum Ecclesiasticorum Latinorum
Corpus Christianorum

Notes

External links
 Patrologia Latina (html) vol. 1-221; ed. 1844-1855, 1862-1865; Jacques Paul Migne.
 Corpus Corporum, Patrologia Latina, repository of high quality machine-readable texts organized alphabetically by author (University of Zurich) 
 Complete catalog of downloadable PDFs of PL volumes in Google Books and Archive.
 Catalog of PL volumes in Google Books, by Mischa Hooker.
 Patrologia Latina Digitalized Database at Documenta Catholica Omnia.
 Patrologia Latina Database (UK) or Patrologia Latina Database (USA) (subscription required).
  Many Latin and Greek editions with translation in French
 A comprehensive catalog of PL volumes in Google Books and Gallica, where was included duplicated imprints, with the year and the edition of each volume founded [Migne and/or Garnier brothers], by Francisco Arriaga [Updated May 11, 2010].
 Patrologia Latina (PL) PDF's at Roger Pearse.
 An open source XML version of the Patrologia Latina has been made available by the Open Greek and Latin Project at the University of Leipzig.

Publications of patristic texts
19th-century Latin books
Editorial collections
Lists of books
Middle Ages Christian texts
Series of books